ABC New England North West  is an ABC Local Radio station based in Tamworth and broadcasting to the regions of New England, the Northern Tablelands and North West Slopes in New South Wales.  This includes the towns and cities of Armidale, Moree, Tenterfield and Glen Innes.

History
The station began as 2NU in 1948 and is now heard on these main AM and FM frequencies along with a number of low-power FM repeaters:

2NU 648 AM
2GL 819 AM
2NWR 99.1 and 101.9 FM

The first broadcast was held in the then-small town hall, and studios were built a year later, with music programs only broadcast at 8:45 to 9:00 am. The next year, local sporting programs and news bulletins were introduced. In 1953, the breakfast program was introduced, and three years later, the Local Women's Session program began.

References

See also
 List of radio stations in Australia

New England North West
Radio stations in New South Wales
Radio stations established in 1948
1948 establishments in Australia